The India national football team represents India in international football and is governed by the All India Football Federation (AIFF).  The team is affiliated to FIFA and Asian Football Confederation (AFC).

Indian team, which was once considered one of the best teams in Asia, had its golden era during the 1950s and early 1960s. During this period, India won gold at the 1951 and 1962 Asian Games, while finishing fourth at the 1956 Summer Olympics. Thus, India became the first Asian nation to reach the semi-final of a FIFA organised major tournament. India has never participated in the FIFA World Cup, although they did qualify by default for the 1950 FIFA World Cup of Brazil after all other nations in their qualification group withdrew. However, India withdrew prior to the beginning of the tournament due to unspecified reasons. The India national football team is arguably the strongest team in South Asia, it has appeared four times in the AFC Asian Cup, Asia's top football championship, and finished as runners-up once in 1964. India regularly participates in the SAFF Championship, the top football tournament in South Asia. It has won this tournament record eight times since its inception in 1993, thus India is the most successful team in the region.

History

Early years (1930s–1940s) 

The first known official international tour of the Indian team, which at that time consisted of both Indian and British players, was in 1924, when it was led by Indian footballer Gostha Paul.

Football teams consisting of entirely Indian players started to tour Australia, Japan, Indonesia, and Thailand during the late 1930s. The first international match India played before independence is yet to be verified, but they are known to have played Ceylon in 1933, winning 1–0.

After the success of several Indian football clubs abroad, the All India Football Federation (AIFF) was formed in 1937. In the same year, India carried out a lengthy tour of Australia at the request of the Australian Football Association. From August to October, they played 17 matches against various state, district, and club teams, and 5 friendly matches against the Australian national team. The first of these, on 3 September in Sydney, is India's first international game to be recognised by FIFA, and ended in a 5–3 defeat. After drawing the second match in Brisbane 4–4, India won the third match at Newcastle 4–1 to claim their first international win.

The national team played their first match as an independent nation in the first round of the 1948 Summer Olympics against France, in a 2–1 defeat. Famously, the Indian team did not wear boots, playing either barefoot or in socks, something that would be banned by FIFA later in the year.

Golden years (1950s–1960s) 

In 1950, India managed to qualify for the 1950 FIFA World Cup, which was scheduled to take place in Brazil, after all the other teams in their qualifying group withdrew. However, India themselves withdrew from the tournament shortly before it began; officially, this was due to travel costs, but FIFA had offered to pay the team's travel expenses, and the real reason behind their withdrawal has been widely speculated in the decades since. While it was commonly believed that India withdrew due to FIFA's ban on playing barefoot, the team's captain at the time, Sailen Manna, insisted that this was not the case; it is now generally accepted that India withdrew simply because they valued the Olympics more than the World Cup and did not view the latter is being prestigious enough to justify taking part. Since then, India have yet to qualify for another World Cup.

Despite not participating in the World Cup in 1950, the following years until 1964 are usually considered to be the "golden era" of Indian football. India, coached by Hyderabad City Police head coach Syed Abdul Rahim, became one of the best teams in Asia. In March 1951, Rahim led India to their first ever triumph during the 1951 Asian Games. Hosted in India, the team defeated Iran 1–0 in the gold medal match to win their first trophy. Sahu Mewalal scored the winning goal for India in that match. The following year, India competed in the 1952 Olympic Games in Helsinki, but were unused to the cold conditions and lost 10–1 to Yugoslavia. Following this defeat, the AIFF made it mandatory for footballers to wear boots. After taking the defeat in Finland, India participated in various minor tournaments, such as the Colombo Cup, which they won four times from 1952 to 1955.

In 1954, India returned to the Asian Games as defending champions in Manila. Despite their achievement three years prior, India was unable to go past the group stage as the team finished second in Group C during the tournament, two points behind Indonesia. Two years later, during the 1956 Summer Olympics, India went on to achieve the team's greatest result in a competitive tournament. The team finished in fourth place during the Summer Olympics football tournament, losing the bronze-medal match to Bulgaria 3–0. The tournament is also known for Neville D'Souza's hat-trick against Australia in the quarterfinals. D'Souza's hat-trick was the first scored by an Asian in Olympic history.

After their good performance during the Summer Olympics, India participated in the 1958 Asian Games in Tokyo. The team once again finished fourth, losing the bronze-medal match to Indonesia 4–1. The next year the team travelled to Malaysia where they took part in the Merdeka Cup and finished as the tournament runners-up.

India began the 1960s with the 1960 AFC Asian Cup qualifiers. Despite the qualifiers for the West Zone being held in Kochi, India finished last in their qualification group and thus missed out the tournament. Despite the set-back, India went on to win the gold medal during the Asian Games for the second time in 1962. The team defeated South Korea 2–1 to win their second major championship.

Two years later, following their Asian Games triumph, India participated in the 1964 AFC Asian Cup after all the other teams in their qualification group withdrew. Despite their automatic entry into the continental tournament, India managed to finish as the runners-up during the tournament, losing out to the hosts, Israel, by two points. This remains India's best performance in the AFC Asian Cup.

Decline (1970s–2000) 

India returned to the Asian Games in 1966. Despite their performance two years prior during the AFC Asian Cup, India could not go beyond the group stage as the team finished third, behind Japan and Iran. Four years later, during the 1970 Asian Games, India came back and took third place during the tournament. The team defeated Japan 1–0 during the bronze-medal match.

In 1974, India's performance in the Asian Games once again sharply declined as they finished the 1974 edition in last place in their group, losing all three matches, scoring two, and conceding 14 goals in the first round. India then showed steady improvement during the 1978 tournament, finishing second in their group of three. The team were then knocked-out in the next round, finishing last in their group with three defeats from three matches. The 1982 tournament proved to be better for India as the side managed to qualify for the quarter-finals before losing to Saudi Arabia 1–0.

In 1984, India managed to qualify for the AFC Asian Cup for the first time since their second place triumph in 1964. During the 1984 tournament, India finished in last place in their five team group in the first round. India's only non-defeat during the tournament came against Iran, a 0–0 draw.

Despite India's decline from a major football power in Asia, the team still managed to assert its dominance as the top team in South Asia. India managed to win the football competition of the South Asian Games in 1985 and then again won the gold medal in 1987. The team then began the 1990s by winning the inaugural SAFF Championship in 1993. The team ended the 20th century by winning the SAFF Championship again in 1997 and 1999.

Resurgence (2001–2011) 

India's first competitive matches of the 21st century were the 2002 FIFA World Cup first round qualifiers. India took a very bright start, defeating the United Arab Emirates 1–0, drawing Yemen 1–1, as well as two victories over Brunei, including a 5–0 victory in Bangalore. However, they finished a point away from qualification for the next round. In 2003, India took part in the 2003 SAFF Championship. The team qualified for the semi-finals but fell to Bangladesh 2–1.

Later in 2003, India participated in the Afro-Asian Games being held in Hyderabad. Under the coaching of Stephen Constantine, India managed to make it to the final of the tournament after defeating Zimbabwe, a team ranked 85 places above India in the FIFA rankings at the time, 5–3. Despite the major victory, during the gold-medal match India were defeated 1–0 by Uzbekistan. Because of this achievement, Constantine was voted as the Asian Football Confederation's Manager of the Month for October 2003. The tournament result also gave India more recognition around the country and around the world.

Constantine was replaced by Syed Nayeemuddin in 2005 but the Indian head coach only lasted for a little over a year as India suffered many heavy defeats during the 2007 AFC Asian Cup qualifiers. During this time India were defeated 6–0 by Japan, 3–0 by Saudi Arabia and Yemen respectively at home, and 7–1 away in Jeddah. Former Malmö and China coach Bob Houghton was brought in as head coach in May 2006.

Under Houghton, India witnessed massive improvement in their football standing. In August 2007, Houghton won the country the restarted Nehru Cup after India defeated Syria 1–0 in the final. Pappachen Pradeep scored the winning goal for India that match. The next year, Houghton led India during the 2008 AFC Challenge Cup, which was hosted in Hyderabad and Delhi. During the tournament, India breezed through the group stage before defeating Myanmar in the semi-finals. In the final against Tajikistan, India, through a Sunil Chhetri hat-trick, won the match 4–1. The victory not only earned India the championship but it also allowed India to qualify for the 2011 AFC Asian Cup, the nation's first Asian Cup appearance in 27 years. In order to prepare for the Asian Cup, Houghton had the team stay together as a squad for eight months from June 2010 until the start of the tournament, meaning the players would not play for their clubs.

India were drawn into Group C for the Asian Cup with Australia, South Korea, and Bahrain. Even though they stayed together as a team for eight months, India lost all three of their matches during the Asian Cup, including a 4–0 defeat to Australia. Despite the results, India were praised by fans and pundits for their valiant efforts during the tournament.

2011–present 

After participating the 2011 AFC Asian Cup, India's campaign to qualify for the 2015 Asian Cup began in February 2011 with the AFC Challenge Cup qualifiers. Bob Houghton decided to change the makeup of the India squad, replacing many of the older players from the Asian Cup with some young players from the AIFF development side in the I-League, Indian Arrows. Even with a young side, India managed to qualify for the AFC Challenge Cup. Despite qualifying for the AFC Challenge Cup, the AIFF decided to terminate the contract of Bob Houghton as he was charged with racial abuse towards referee which ultimately resulted in his resignation as the head coach of India.

After having Dempo coach Armando Colaco as interim head coach, the AIFF signed Savio Medeira as head coach in October 2011. Medeira led India to another SAFF Championship victory, but also to their worst performance in the AFC Challenge Cup in March 2012. The team lost all three of their group matches, unable to score a single goal during the tournament. After the tournament, Medeira was replaced as head coach by Dutchman, Wim Koevermans. Koevermans' first job as head coach was the 2012 Nehru Cup. India won their third successive Nehru Cup, defeating Cameroon on penalties.

In March 2013, India failed to qualify for the 2014 AFC Challenge Cup and thus also failed to qualify for the 2015 AFC Asian Cup. The team also failed to retain the SAFF Championship, losing 2–0 to Afghanistan in the 2013 final. After more bad results in friendlies, Koevermans resigned as head coach in October 2014.

By March 2015, after not playing any matches, India reached their lowest FIFA ranking position of 173. A couple months prior, Stephen Constantine was re-hired as the head coach after first leading India more than a decade before. Constantine's first major assignment back as the India head coach were the 2018 FIFA World Cup qualifiers. After making it through the first round of qualifiers, India crashed out during the second round, losing seven of their eight matches and thus, once again, failed to qualify for the World Cup.

Despite failure to qualify for the World Cup, India managed to reach the third round of 2019 AFC Asian Cup qualifiers after defeating Laos in the play-off round on aggregate 7–1. On 11 October 2017, India secured qualification for the 2019 AFC Asian Cup after a 4–1 victory over Macau.

Though defeated at 2018 SAFF Championship final by 1–2 to Maldives in September 2018, India regained the momentum with some friendlies against China, Jordan and Oman as they began the 2019 AFC Asian Cup with a 4–1 victory against Thailand; this was their biggest ever win at the Asia Cup, and their first in 55 years. Nevertheless, they lost both of their next two group matches against UAE and Bahrain by 0−2 and 0−1 respectively and finished at the bottom of the group, thus failed to move to knock out stage. Stephen Constantine immediately resigned from his position as head coach following the failure to progress further in the tournament.

On 15 May 2019, the AIFF announced former Croatian player and coach Igor Štimac as the team's head coach after the departure of Stephen Constantine. His first major assignment with India was 2022 World Cup qualification, where it began with a 1–2 home loss to Oman. But in the second match they earned a respectable point after managing a goalless draw against the 2019 Asian Champion and 2022 FIFA World Cup host Qatar. However, in the third match, the home leg against Bangladesh saw them managing a disappointing 1−1 draw. A similar result was repeated in the away leg against Afghanistan. In the away leg, India lost yet again to Oman by a solitary goal, thus shortening their hopes to qualify for the next round. After several postponements due to COVID-19, the team finally flew to Doha to play their remainder of games. In the return leg against Qatar, India went down to the hosts with a single goal and got knocked out of the World Cup qualification tournament with two games to spare. The team then made a comeback by winning their next match against Bangladesh with 2–0, and ended their campaign with a 1–1 draw against Afghanistan. With seven points in total, India finished third on the table behind Qatar and Oman, thus getting eliminated from the World Cup during the second round. However they were qualified into the third round of 2023 AFC Asian Cup qualification.

In the third round of the 2023 AFC Asian Cup qualification, India was drawn in the same group with Afghanistan, Hong Kong and Cambodia. Due to the COVID-19 pandemic, India was chosen as the host of the group of the qualifiers while the qualification was reduced into a single round robin format. Using this home advantage, India was able to top the group with three wins against Cambodia (2–0), Afghanistan (2–1) and Hong Kong (4–0),  therefore for the first time, India qualified for two consecutive AFC Asian Cups in history.

FIFA Suspension
On 16 August 2022, FIFA Council unanimously decided to suspend India with immediate effect due to undue influence from third parties, which constitutes a serious violation of the FIFA Statutes. As a result, India was temporarily excluded from next Asian Cup edition until the suspension got lifted before the tournament began. In response to the ban, AIFF agreed to hold an election on September 2 to restore India's participation in FIFA once it got a new administration. On 27 August, FIFA lifted suspension on India, after the government agreed to end its interference in the AIFF, allowing the AIFF administration to resume activities.

Team image

Nicknames
India is officially known by the nickname  'Blue Tigers'  since 2013. It is inspired by the colour Blue which forms the primary colour of the team's home kit, depicting Ashoka Chakra's colour in the national flag (similar to the Indian national teams of other sports) and the Tiger which is the national animal of India.

Before being nicknamed as Blue Tigers, the team was known as 'Bhangra Boys'. The old nickname came about during India's friendly match against English side West Bromwich Albion on July 26, 2000. The crowd consisting mostly of Indian or Indian origin fans created a great atmosphere with drums and dhols to cheer India until the final scoreline of 0–0. That night the term the  'Bhangra Boys'  was born and over those three tours, it became India's nickname with which the fans could identify, especially in 2002 when India took on Jamaica in the Jamaica tour which was also named as the "Reggae Boyz vs the Bhangra Boys".

Kit and colours

The success of the India cricket team and field hockey teams in blue jerseys made the colour more prominent. The football team, however, has used some sort of shade of blue for decades.

At the turn of the 21st century, India wore a sky blue shirt with black shorts and sky blue socks as their kit. In 2002, the All India Football Federation signed a deal with German manufacturer Adidas to produce the India kit. The first kit made by Adidas was all-white. After four years with Adidas, the AIFF signed an agreement for seven years with American company Nike on 27 February 2006. Nike's first kits for India were in darker blue while the away kit was changed from white to orange. For the 2011 AFC Asian Cup, in which India were participating, Nike designed India's kit using the same template it used for other national teams such as Brazil. In January 2013. it was announced that the AIFF's deal with Nike was extended for an extra five years. In September 2017, prior to the India U17 side's participation in the FIFA U-17 World Cup, Nike unveiled an all sky blue kit for the India senior and youth teams. A year later, on 17 December 2018, it was announced that Indian manufacturer SIX5SIX would replace Nike as India's kit maker. In becoming India's new kit makers, Six5Six also became the first manufacturer to pay for the rights to produce India kits, after both Nike and Adidas didn't pay. Six5Six unveiled their first jerseys for the team before the 2019 AFC Asian Cup, from which the home colour had a similar sky blue shade and the away colour was changed to white from orange. Both jerseys had a unique design embellished on the sleeves representing tiger stripes to pay homage to the Indian football fans, who affectionately calls the team "Blue Tigers".

Home stadiums

Numerous venues around India have hosted home matches for the national team. There is no specific home ground for the India national team. India matches have been played at stadiums such as the Salt Lake Stadium in Kolkata, the Jawaharlal Nehru Stadium in Delhi, the Fatorda Stadium in Margao, the Sree Kanteerava Stadium in Bangalore, the Jawaharlal Nehru Stadium in Kochi, the Mumbai Football Arena in Mumbai, the Indira Gandhi Athletic Stadium in Guwahati and the EKA Arena in Ahmedabad.

In recent times, competitions like 2011 SAFF Championship and 2012 Nehru Cup were held at Jawaharlal Nehru Stadium in Delhi, the 2015 SAFF Championship at Trivandrum International Stadium, 2017 Hero Tri-Nation Series and 2018 Intercontinental Cup at Mumbai Football Arena and 2019 Intercontinental Cup at the EKA Arena. Indira Gandhi Athletic Stadium, Sree Kanteerava Stadium and Fatorda stadium have seen AFC Asian Cup and FIFA World Cup qualifiers.

Supporters

Till the 21st century, the Indian football fans were mostly scattered, being widely based in West Bengal, North-East India, Goa and Kerala. Other than matches in Asian Games, Nehru Cup or SAFF Championship, the crowd showed up in small numbers when the team played as the fans were not organised under any single banner as happens in Europe or South America. Fans of different clubs used to support the team in their respective local venues but were not grouped together to support a single cause, that of the national team, until 2017 when "Blue Pilgrims" was established as the first organised fan club for the national team.

The Blue Pilgrims formed with a motive to support the national team and the U-17 team during the historic 2017 U17 World Cup, India's first ever FIFA competition participation. Started with 300 odd fans, now they are in thousands as a unification of fans from different regions with different allegiances came together for just one cause, the Blue Tigers. They call themselves the devotees of the Blue Tigers, and their motto is to support India national football teams of all gender and age, wherever they play and for such dedication they are called as the 12th man of the team.

The Blue Pilgrims's most common chants are: "Oh India!", "In Unity we stand", "Oh India we stand for you!", "Vande Mataram". Their sports anthems are "Oh when the blues go marching in, I wanna be in that number!" and "Hum honge kaamyab" (We shall overcome). Since its formation, the Blue Pilgrims use to celebrate after every match with Viking clap with the national team members. Fans of the India national team display the country's tricolour National flag and also wear blue jerseys in solidarity with the team. They used to display their banner Blue Pilgrims along with "Inquilab-e-Indian football" (Revolution of Indian football) and often shout their common slogan, We love you, wherever you go, we follow!". On 2 June 2018, the then captain Sunil Chhetri posted a video on social media. In his video he urged the fans to come out at Mumbai to support the team after a poor crowd appearance of only 2569 at a match against Chinese Taipei in the 2018 Intercontinental Cup. India achieved a massive victory in that match, winning by 5−0 with Chhetri scoring a hat-trick, but there were very few people present to celebrate. Responding to the captain's call, the Blue Pilgrims and football supporters including the fan clubs like Manjappada, West Block Blues and East Bengal Ultras made sure that the stadiums were full during the next few matches.

Rivalries

China

China and India have shared cultural and economic relations that date back to ancient period, but the rivalry between the two Asian sides is developed during the recent times due to the intense bilateral relations from the Sino-Indian war and border disputes. With seven wins and four draws, China has been the dominant side in this rivalry. In October 2018, the rivalry was popularized as the 'Earth Derby' by media in a friendly since the two nations shared one-third of the world's population.

Pakistan

India and Pakistan share sporting rivalry in any given sport. In football, India has won the most number of games (15), there have been seven draws and three wins for Pakistan among the 25 games played so far.

Media coverage

India's competitive international games are covered on television by Star Sports and on its OTT service, Hotstar. Prior to this deal, the AIFF had struck a ten-year deal with Zee Sports in 2006 to broadcast Indian national team's games on its channel with the initiative of  'Goal 2010' . The aim of this whole exercise was to help India qualify for the 2010 World Cup.

Results and fixtures

Matches in the last 12 months, and future scheduled matches

2022

2023

2024

Coaching staff

Current personnel

On 15 May 2019, Igor Štimac was announced as the head coach of the national team. Joining him as the other technical staffs were his fellow Croats Luka Radman and Tomislav Rogić, as fitness and goalkeeping coach respectively.

The AIFF's technical committee conducted a virtual meeting on 29 May 2021, where they decided to hand over an extension to the head coach Igor Štimac's tenure for three more months. The committee also decided not to extend the technical director, Doru Isac's contract and appointed Savio Medeira as the interim technical director. On 
20 June 2021, the technical committee decided to hand over a one-year extension to Štimac, which lasted in accordance to the 3rd Round of Asian Cup Qualifiers, and subsequently for the 2023 AFC Asian Cup.

Players

Current squad
The following 23 players were named in the squad for the Tri-Nation international football tournament in India.

Caps and goals are correct as of 27 September 2022, after the match against .

Recent callups
The following players have been called up to India within the last twelve months.

 INJ Withdrew from the squad due to injury
 OTH Withdrew from the squad due to other issues
 COV Tested positive for COVID-19

Notable players

During the early 20th century, India produced one of the best footballers from Asia at that time, Gostha Pal. Pal began playing professional football at the age of 16 in 1911, becoming India's first captain, and was considered one of the best defenders India had ever produced. He was also the first footballer to be awarded Padma Shree in the year 1962, and in 1998, the Government of India introduced a postal stamp in his honour. In the later 1930s, players like R. Lumsden, Noor Mohammed, T. Rahim, K. Prosad, A. Nandi under the leadership of Karuna Bhattacharya played for India who scored a total of 56 goals in 17 matches during the 1938 Australia tour out of which 5 matches were against Australia, where Lumsden scored the first international hat-trick for India.

India's first captain after the country gained independence was Dr. Talimeren Ao. At a very young age, using footballs made out of rags, Ao gradually improved his skills as a defensive midfielder. He was given the responsibility of leading the team at the 1948 Olympics, India's first major tournament and also was the flag bearer of Indian contingents in London. Also during this era, India produced Sailen Manna, one of the country's best defenders. He was given the India captaincy in 1951 during the Asian Games, led the team to the gold medal, India's first major internationally honour, and also captained the team during the 1952 Olympics and 1954 Asian Games. In 1953, England Football Association rated Manna among "10 Best Skippers of the World" in its yearbook, the Government of India awarded him Padma Shri in 1971 and AIFF honoured him as "AIFF Player-of-the-Millennium" in 2000.

During India's golden era between the 1950s and early 60s, the country produced coveted strikers such as Sheoo Mewalal, Neville D'Souza, Chuni Goswami and Tulsidas Balaram. Mewalal was India's starting striker during the 1948 Olympics, 1952 Olympics and 1951 Asian games where he ended as the tournament top goalscorer with four goals. Mewalal was the first Indian player to score a hat-trick since the country gained independence when he scored it against Burma during the 1952 Colombo Cup. D'Souza meanwhile became the first Asian player to score a hat-trick at the Olympic Games, scoring a hat-trick against Australia during the 1956 Olympics. D'Souza also tied for top goalscorer in that edition of the Olympics, which helped India reach the semi-finals. Goswami represented India at the 1958 Asian Games and the 1960 Olympics, and captained the side during the 1962 Asian Games and the 1964 Asian Cup. He was bestowed with Padma Shri by the Government of India and AFC honoured him as "Best Striker of Asia" in 1962.

P. K. Banerjee, a winger who represented India at the 1956 Olympics and later captained the side during the 1960 Olympics, was named as the best "Indian player of the 20th Century". Peter Thangaraj was the starting goalkeeper for India during the later stage of India's golden era, being named as best "Indian keeper of the 20th Century" by IFFHS. P. K. Banerjee was honoured with Padma Shri by Government of India in 1990, and in 2004 FIFA bestowed him with "FIFA Centennial Order of Merit" Award, the highest honour awarded by FIFA.

From the 1970s to the 2000s, India saw a decline in their results. Despite the lack of tournament victories, the country managed to produce players like Syed Nayeemuddin who led India to bronze at the 1970 Asian Games. During the 1990s, I. M. Vijayan, India's best player at the time, was capped 66 times for India while scoring 29 goals and captaining the team several times.

In 1995, Bhaichung Bhutia debuted for India. With Bhutia, India qualified for the AFC Asian Cup after a drought of 27 years. He was the captain of the team for over ten years. Considered one of the greatest footballers of India, he is the second-most-capped player of India with 82 caps and scored 27 times for India. He was awarded the Padma Shri in 2008 and IFFHS listed him among the legendary players of football in 2016.
Under Bhutia's captaincy Sunil Chhetri debuted for India who is now the only footballer in India's history to have played 100 international matches and is the all-time highest goal-scorer of India. Chhetri led the national team to many victories, most importantly qualifying for the AFC Asian Cup and under his leadership the team achieved its highest FIFA ranking of 96 after twenty-one years. His goal-scoring ability and skills made him the only Indian striker to score three hat-tricks for India.

Competitive record

FIFA World Cup

India has never played in the finals of a FIFA World Cup. After gaining independence in 1947, India managed to qualify for the World Cup held in 1950. This was due to Myanmar, Indonesia, and the Philippines withdrawing from qualification round. However, prior to the start of the tournament, India themselves withdrew due to the expenses required in getting the team to Brazil. But this reason was untrue because FIFA was ready to give money to India (AIFF) for their trip to Brazil. Other reasons cited for why India withdrew include FIFA not allowing Indian players to play in the tournament barefoot and the All India Football Federation not considering the FIFA World Cup an important tournament compared to the Olympics, but according to some pundits barefoot was a made up story, manufactured by AIFF to stop people asking questions on 'why India didn't participate in the 1950 FIFA world cup?'  AIFF did not have confidence in then Indian players that they would complete in world cup against world’s top teams and win.

After withdrawing from the 1950 FIFA World Cup, India did not enter the qualifying rounds of the tournament between 1954 and 1982. Since the 1986 qualifiers, with the exception of the 1990 edition of the tournament, the team participated in World Cup qualification, but has yet to qualify for the finals again.

AFC Asian Cup

India has qualified for the AFC Asian Cup five times. The team played their first Asian Cup in 1964. The team managed to qualify following other nations' refusal to play against India due to political reasons. India managed to finish the tournament as runners-up to hosts Israel, with Inder Singh finishing as joint top-scorer. Since then India has failed to progress beyond the first round of the Asian Cup with their participation at the 1984 and 2011 Asian Cups, and most recently the 2019 Asian Cup.

Summer Olympics

India competed in four straight Olympic football tournaments between 1948 and 1960. Their sole 1948 Olympics match against France was also India's first ever international match since the country gained independence in 1947. During the match, a majority of the Indian side played barefoot. The match ended in a 2–1 defeat, with Sarangapani Raman scoring the lone goal for India. India then returned to the Olympics four years later where they took on Yugoslavia in the preliminary rounds. The team suffered a 10–1 defeat, India's largest margin of defeat, and were knocked out.

Four years later, during the 1956 Olympics, India managed to reach the semi-finals and finish fourth. After India's first round opponents, Hungary, withdrew from the tournament, the team played against hosts Australia in the quarter-finals. A Neville D'Souza hat-trick, the first by an Asian footballer in the Olympics, helped India win 4–2. However, in the semi-finals, India once again suffered defeat against Yugoslavia, going down 4–1. In the bronze medal match, India were defeated 3–0 by Bulgaria.

In 1960, India competed in Group D with Hungary, France and Peru. India ended the group in last place, drawing once. India have since failed to qualify for another Olympic games.

Asian Games

India competed in eleven Asian Games starting from 1951 to 1998 except the 1990 and 1994 editions. In 1951 Asiad India won their first match against Indonesia in the first round and then defeated Japan in semi-final and went on to win against Iran in the final in front of the home crowd. The achievement of the Indian team was a special one as they became the first ever Asian Games gold medalists and also the first ever Asian football champions.

Though the next two tournaments proved less successful for the team, but they bounced back by winning the gold at the 1962 Asian games by defeating the Asian Cup winners South Korea in the final to win their second continental title. The team failed to defend their title in 1966 and went on to claim the bronze medal in 1970.

This was the last time India ever finished on the medal podium, the next years proved to be hard for the Indian team to regain their dominance as the side went through a sharp decline. After two disappointing editions in 1974 and 1978, India performed much better in the 1982 Asiad, which they hosted for the second time by reaching the quarter-finals but lost to Saudi Arabia. Due to the poor performance in 1986 Asian Games the authorities decided not to send the team for the upcoming games. The team made their return in 1998.

SAFF Championship

India has played in all thirteen editions of the SAFF Championship and has been the most successful team in the competition winning an overall eight titles. The team played in the knockout stage of every tournament except in 1993 when the tournament was in a league format. The team also boasts a prestigious record of claiming medal at every championships played so far.

India has played in the final of every championship except the 2003 tournament where they claimed bronze medal for the first time. India also boasts several records such as the team has scored the most goals, conceded least numbers of goals, registered the most wins, and had fewer defeats than any other team in the competition's history.

AFC Challenge Cup

India has participated in the AFC Challenge Cup four times. The tournament was originally created for countries categorized as emerging association, though India was invited to take part by AFC along with other developing association countries such as North Korea and Bangladesh. The team won the 2008 AFC Challenge Cup and qualified to the Asian Cup after 27 years.

Honours
These are the following major honours won by India that are officially organised and recognized by FIFA, AFC and SAFF.

FIFA 
Summer Olympics
Fourth place: 1956

AFC 
AFC Asian Cup
Runners-up: 1964
Asian Games
Gold medal: 1951, 1962
Bronze medal: 1970
Fourth place: 1958
AFC Challenge Cup
Winners: 2008

SAFF 
SAFF Championship
Winners: 1993, 1997, 1999, 2005, 2009, 2011, 2015, 2021
Runners-up: 1995, 2008, 2013, 2018
Third place: 2003

See also

 Youth teams
 India U-23
 India U-20
 India U-17
 Football in India
 Women's football in India
 History of Indian football
 Mission XI Million
 Futsal Association of India
 India national beach soccer team 
 India national football team results 
 India women's national football team results
 Miscellaneous
 List of India national football team hat-tricks
 List of Indian expatriate footballers
List of India international footballers born abroad
 Others 
 Rugby in India
 Sports in India – overview of 'Sports in India'

References

External links

 All India Football Federation (official website)
 
 
 Team profile at FIFA
Team ranking at FIFA
 Team profile: India at BeSoccer
Team overview at Sportskeeda

 
Football in India
Asian national association football teams
AFC Challenge Cup-winning countries
1948 establishments in India